Ryszard Tomczyk (born 27 April 1950) is a retired Polish featherweight boxer who won three medals at the European championships in 1971–75, including a gold in 1971. He competed at the 1972 Summer Olympics, and lost in the third bout to the eventual gold medalist Boris Kuznetsov.

References

1950 births
Living people
Boxers at the 1972 Summer Olympics
Olympic boxers of Poland
Polish male boxers
People from Trzebnica
Sportspeople from Lower Silesian Voivodeship
Featherweight boxers